The João Leite River is a river of Goiás state in central Brazil. It is a tributary of the Meia Ponte River.

Reservoir

In May 1994 part of the Altamiro de Moura Pacheco State Park was removed to make way for the Ribeirão João Leite Reservoir, planned to supply water to the Metropolitan Region of Goiânia, the state capital.
The João Leite Reservoir provides water for over one million people. 
The two parks now total .

Springs

In February 2015 the head of the state office for environmental crimes warned that 23 springs that feed the Ribeirão João Leite can no longer be recovered.
The river has 491 springs in total, of which 70 are fully protected.
Unless action was taken to protect the remaining springs, the reservoir would dry up in a few years.
Farmers have been cooperating with efforts to recover the environment around the remaining springs.

See also
List of rivers of Goiás

References

Sources

Rivers of Goiás